WKBY is a Black Gospel and Religious formatted broadcast radio station licensed to Chatham, Virginia, serving Danville and Pittsylvania County, Virginia.  WKBY is owned and operated by Lawrence Campbell.

References

External links
 Inspirational 1080 Online

1966 establishments in Virginia
Gospel radio stations in the United States
Radio stations established in 1966
KBY
KBY
Danville, Virginia